Binzhou or Bin Prefecture (邠州) was a zhou (prefecture) in imperial China centering around modern Bin County (彬县), Shaanxi, China. It existed from 725 to 1913.

Geography
The administrative region of Bin Prefecture during the Tang dynasty is in Xianning, Shaanxi. It probably includes parts of modern: 
Bin County
Changwu County
Xunyi County
Yongshou County

See also
Xinping Commandery

References
 

Prefectures of Qi (Five Dynasties)
Prefectures of Later Tang
Prefectures of Later Jin (Five Dynasties)
Prefectures of Later Han (Five Dynasties)
Prefectures of Later Zhou
Prefectures of the Song dynasty
Prefectures of the Yuan dynasty
Subprefectures of the Ming dynasty
Prefectures of the Jin dynasty (1115–1234)
Former prefectures in Shaanxi